Glastra is a small village in the Peloponnese, Greece. It is part of the municipality of Kalavryta.

Nearby is the village of Kastria and the settlement of Agios Vlasios.

References

Populated places in Achaea